Farnese is a  (municipality) in the Province of Viterbo in the Italian region of Latium, located about  northwest of Rome and about  northwest of Viterbo.

Geography
Farnese borders the following municipalities: Ischia di Castro, Pitigliano, Valentano.

Personalities
The well-known Italian-Brazilian sculptor Victor Brecheret is born in Farnese

References

External links

Cities and towns in Lazio